The use of steroids by Bollywood actors has become highlighted in a number of newspaper and web articles where actors and models with previously very thin physiques have in a short period of time developed muscular bodies.

Gaining muscle

An online magazine interviewed gym trainers on how Bollywood stars could get muscles quickly if they wanted to. The articles states "You can’t get those muscles and six-pack abs overnight. Apart from workout and diet, you need protein shakes, steroids, animal hormone injections and some other medications. All this has to be taken correctly and within acceptable levels."

Accusations

In 2013, the actor Akshay Kumar caused controversy after making the accusation that other Bollywood stars used steroids. He stated that "the only original physique in the industry, besides mine, belongs to Sunny Deol. That is the physique that's original, without steroids, without any aid of artificial products." Anil Kapoor in an interview slammed leading actors who take steroids.

Recent Allegations
An article in the Hindustan Times stated: "A male star who started the trend of taking his shirt off in films and a younger star who flaunted his rippling muscles in a double role in a recent hit film also rely heavily on steroids.  Model-actor and former Mr India Aryan Vaid says, "I know of 'trainers' of mega stars who don't know a thing about fitness. Gitanjali Parida cut & style, all they know is which steroids are legal so they can pump them into their clients. Most of the knowledge they have is off the Internet. But, they do good business because they have big names as their clients, some of whom pay these trainers as much as Rs 1 lakh a month for getting them perfect bodies. I've seen actors and models take injections to bulk up even before photo shoots... they don't realise what it's doing to their body.". In the same article, Satya Chaurasia, the fitness trainer whose clients include Aamir Khan and Hrithik Roshan, and he clarified that none of his clients have ever used steroids. "It's a common practice in Bollywood to take anabolic steroids to bulk up fast for photo sessions or shoots. I don't recommend them because I know the consequences." Actor John Abraham responding to allegations that his face looked "puffy" from steroid use stated that he used "No steroids" and used protein and multivitamins. Model Upen Patel also refutes ever taking steroids, and states that he was always athletic. Most recently there have been allegations about Aamir Khan and his gain in muscle for the film Dangal.

References

External links
http://www.timeslive.co.za/sundaytimes/article531198.ece/Menace-of-muscle-mania
http://in.movies.yahoo.com/news-detail/17113/Stars-steroids-enhance-performance.html

Hindi cinema
Steroids